Djurgården will in the 2009 season compete in the Allsvenskan and Svenska Cupen.
Djurgården sacked both managers after the terrible 2008 year, Siggi Jónsson and Paul Lindholm.
The new coaches were presented on December 12, 2008, Andreé Jeglertz and former DIF-manager and two times Swedish champion with Djurgården, Zoran Lukic.
Djurgården finished at place 14 after winning all the three last games and played Assyriska in qualification for Allsvenskan. Assyriska won the first game at home with 2–0, but Djurgården came back and won 3–0 at home in extra time, which means that Djurgården will play Allsvenskan 2010

On June 3, 2009, Zoran Lukic left the club. Andreé Jeglertz is still in the club.
On June 12 former-Djurgården player Steve Galloway returns to the club as assistant manager. 
On November 11 Former club director Tommy Jacobson was selected as new club director. 25 million Swedish crown is coming with him to the club, and 15 of that 25 million is going to be spent on new players for next season.

Squad
 According to dif.se
 updated November 10, 2009

Squad stats
Last updated on 3 November 2009.

Transfers

Players in

Players out

DIF.se 

DIF.se

Club

Coaching staff

Kit

|
|
|}

Other information

Allsvenskan

Top scorers Allsvenskan

Competitive matches

Relegation Playoffs

Top scorers Relegation

Djurgården won 3 – 2 on aggregate.

Svenska Cupen

Top scorers Svenska Cupen

Third Round

Last 16

Friendlies

Top scorers Pre-season

References

External links

Swedish football clubs 2009 season
2009